Paul Morris is an Australian former professional rugby league footballer who played in the 1990s. Primarily a er, he played for the Brisbane Broncos and was a foundation player for the North Queensland Cowboys.

Playing career
Originally from Rockhampton, Morris made his first grade debut for the Brisbane Broncos in Round 13 of the 1994 NSWRL season, starting on the wing and scoring a try in their 10–29 loss to the Canberra Raiders. He would play three more games for them that season, coming off the bench in all three, before joining the North Queensland Cowboys.

A foundation player for the newly formed club, Morris played two games for the Cowboys in 1995, coming off the bench in both.

References

Living people
Australian rugby league players
Brisbane Broncos players
North Queensland Cowboys players
Rugby league players from Rockhampton, Queensland
Rugby league wingers
Year of birth missing (living people)